Anitta is the debut studio album by Brazilian recording artist Anitta, released on July 3, 2013 by Warner Music Brasil. It was preceded by the single "Show das Poderosas," which was the biggest hit song in Brazil in 2013. The album sold over 40,000 copies in the first 10 days after its release. The self-titled album had four singles and earned Anitta a Prêmio Extra, two wins at the Brazilian Music Multishow Award in 2013 and a Latin Grammy Award nomination. To promote the album, she performed on the Rede Globo programs Esquenta!, Caldeirão do Huck, Encontro com Fátima Bernardes, Altas Horas, and Mais Você.

On April 6, 2013, Anitta performed on RecordTV's program Legendários, and continued to make promotional television appearances throughout the spring. "Tá na Mira" was released as the third single on April 23, 2013. The previous single, "Show das Poderosas," was released shortly before "Tá na Mira." In the same month, the music video reached 1 million views in one week on YouTube. On June 21, 2013, Anitta reported on her Facebook page that the album was available for pre-sale at her online store, and its cover was revealed on July 2, 2013.

Production and recording
After having caught the attention of DJ Renato Azevedo (known as Batutinha) by recording a cover of Priscila Nocetti's song "Soltinha" and posting it on her YouTube channel, Anitta was invited by Azevedo to audition. He decided to work with her upon seeing her Stiletto dancing.

Initially, Anitta started working for Hurricane 2000 but in June 2012, businesswoman Kamilla Fialho paid approximately $260,000 so she could manage Anitta. Fialho set up a show with musicians and dancers, invested in the image of Anitta, and presented the album to producers Umberto Tavares and Manozinha. In February 2013, Anitta signed with Warner Music and released "Meiga e Abusada," the album's first single that was, initially, projected for a September 2013 release.

In February 2013, Anitta began composition work with the production team in the studio. According to Wagner Vianna, artistic director of Warner, "the guys went without sleep some nights. Anitta gave a lot of opinions, but it was not complicated." During this period, Anitta alone wrote "Show das Poderosas" and "Tá na Mira," and the record company decided to release the former as the album's second single. Due to the success of the song, the release of the album was pushed up to June 20, 2013. On the cover, Anitta appears on a "brown background, arms open and her name written with pink glitter in the image," according to Caras magazine. Anitta told Caras magazine that the brown background represented the ups and downs she had been through, and the glitter on her name is the success she reached with her first album.

Music and lyrics
The album attempted to fill a "hole" left in the mainstream Brazilian pop market. people magazine wrote that the album incorporated "international influences with an eye on the throne" of Brazilian pop. The album features sterile beats and explores diverse musical genres such as pop, dance-pop, electropop, dubstep, R&B, reggae and funk carioca. In general, the lyrics explore the power of womanhood and seduction, with feminist and sensual themes - similar to songs by Beyoncé, Rihanna, Katy Perry and Kelly Key.

Release and promotion
After "Meiga e Abusada" was released earlier that year, the album was scheduled for release in September 2013. On April 16, Warner Music released the second single, due to the song's commercial performance – peaking at number one on the Billboard Brasil Hot 100 Airplay. The label decided to move the release to July 6, 2013. The album went on pre-sale on iTunes on July 2 and, on the same day, reached number one in the online store. Simultaneously, Anitta had three songs on iTunes' chart – the single and acoustic versions of "Show das Poderosas" and "Não Para." "Proposta" had been previously released as a promotional single on January 16, 2012, even though the singer didn't have a record deal and the song was subsequently included on the tracklist. "Menina Má" was released as a promotional single on August 12, 2012, with the music video produced by Mais UP Produtora. Originally planned as the second single, "Tá na Mira" was eventually replaced by "Show das Poderosas" and the former ended up as promotional release on April 23, 2013. "Eu Sou Assim" was included in the soundtrack of the primetime telenovela Em Família.

Singles
"Meiga e Abusada" was first released on July 6, 2012, as a digital download. The video of the song, which includes co-stars Mayra Cardi (a former star of Big Brother Brasil), was released on YouTube on December 18, 2012, but the song had a single release almost two months later. Cardi appears dressed as a sexy maid, serving dinner to the "boss" and his family. Sonically, the track echoes the style of artists like Katy Perry and was recorded in a studio in Botafogo, south of Rio de Janeiro. The music video was directed by Blake Farber, who also directed Beyoncé videos. The first part of the video was filmed in Las Vegas and in New York City, and Anitta is seen gambling in a casino.

"Show das Poderosas" was released on April 16, 2013 and became Anitta's breakthrough hit. The song has reached over 130 million views and has sold over 50,000 digital copies only in Brazil. The lyric video was released on July 5, 2013. The music video had already been recorded months before the release of the track as a single. Anitta holds total songwriting  credits. "Não Para" was released on July 2, 2013 as the third single, and replaced "Show das Poderosas" in the iTunes top spot. It debuted at #6 on the Brazilian Digital Songs chart with 690 units sold. The official video for the song was released on the TV program Fantástico on July 7, 2013. "Zen" was released on November 4, 2013. In 2014, it was nominated for the Latin Grammy Award for Best Brazilian Song.

Promotional singles
"Proposta" was released on January 16, 2012. "Menina Má" was released on February 16, 2012 as a b-side for "Show das Poderosas." "Tá na Mira" was released on April 23, 2013. An EP with the same title, containing songs like "Meiga e Abusada" plus exclusive songs, was released seven days later.

Critical reception

Anitta was received with mixed criticism from music critics. John Pereira from Audiogram said the album is a cliche pop album but that's not a bad thing. Yuri de Castro from Fita Bruta compared Anitta to Kelly Key and Preta Gil.

Braulio Lorentz from G1 site said that in her first album, Anitta tries to "show that goes beyond the turn that made her to be contracted by a great record company, to inflate its cache and to beat several Brazilian singers". For Lorentz, the tracks of the project are "sticky and whistling," and that Anitta wants to "embrace the pop of Beyoncé (who is always called a fan), Katy Perry (reference declared for the video of "Meiga e Abusada") and singers Brazilians today more distant from the studios, like Kelly Key." Guilherme Tintel for ItPOP, said the album is a compilation of samples of Beyoncé's songs and that the album abuses easy verses and features retention of funk beats. He added: "His vocal talent is very limited, now that he does one show after another he has lost many points in the" stage presence "category - almost always saved by the dancers, besides the good old prerecorded base - and as we said previously, because of the rush to take advantage of his first great success all that the record company did was to launch an album full of similar songs, having good points here or there."

Mauro Ferreira, of the Notas Musicais site, said that Anitta loses its power in the album, in a project that sounds "repetitive and industrialized in excess." Ferreira says the label "boasts" the number of sales, from a project that contains artificial pop tracks to explore the popularity of Anitta, obtained through its hit "Powerful Show." For the critic, the singer has more "pose than voice (small and opaque, say)," and calls her "Gretchen of the dances of the present time."

On the other hand, the website Que Delícia Né, Gente?, says that the first songs on the album are enough to "stick to your head, whether you like it or not." But, that the project contains positive surprises like "Zen" and "Eu Sou Assim". However, the site closes the criticism saying that if "the intention of the record company was to average, he succeeded, but he scraped." The site Verbloose says that Anitta has a "soft and gentle voice" that gives a personal touch to the songs. However, he warns that "there is still a long way to go" for Anitta to become a singer by name, because his album contains "silly, shallow and empty" lyrics, and says that his success is due to lack of competition in the Brazilian music market in relation to pop singers.

Track listing

Charts

Weekly Charts

Year-end charts

Certifications

References

External links
 

2013 debut albums
Anitta (singer) albums
Portuguese-language albums